Lady Bay is an area adjacent to West Bridgford, in Nottinghamshire, England, bounded by the River Trent to the north and the (now disused) Grantham Canal to the south. It is within 2 miles of the centre of Nottingham, but is more suburban/semi-rural in its character.

Trent Boulevard is the main thoroughfare running through the centre of Lady Bay, with several small shops, cafes, takeaways, Lady Bay Primary School and the Lady Bay public house fronting on to it. Another pub, the Poppy and Pint, can be found on Pierrepont Road.
The area takes the form of a wedge of predominantly residential development, with recent increases in residential land values having driven out the last few remaining non-retail business premises. The parallel road layout intersecting the Boulevard dates back to the late 19th century. 

Lady Bay is on the flood plain of the River Trent and has benefited over the years from progressively upgraded flood defences. Between these flood defences (to the north of Holme Road) and the River Trent is an area of statutory washlands known as The Hook.
This meadowland provides a habitat for wildlife and a recreational area for local residents; it floods dramatically every 5–10 years, so will never be developed. The Hook was declared a Local Nature Reserve in December 2009. A 'Friends' group has been established and volunteers work to manage and maintain the site.

To the west corner of Lady Bay lies Lady Bay Bridge, a railway bridge built by the Midland Railway Company circa 1880 serving their direct line to Melton Mowbray and beyond to London. With the closure of this line in 1969 the bridge was converted to road use in 1979.

To the east of Lady Bay is the Holme Pierrepont National Watersports Centre.

To the south, beyond the Grantham Canal, lies West Bridgford itself.

In 1941 a German Luftwaffe bomber dropped a line of bombs across Lady Bay, leading to new houses being built in the 1950-60s on bomb sites in streets of otherwise pre-war housing. The two 'Pinders Ponds' to the east of Lady Bay are also alleged to be as a result of flooded bomb craters. The remains of a disused public air raid shelter is on the corner of Lady Bay Road and Rutland Road.

Lady Bay has an active Church of England parish church, with the Vicar being shared with the adjacent Holme Pierrepont and Adbolton Parish since 2006. All Hallows church on Pierrepont Road was established in 1898 and the present building was designed by William Richard Gleave and dates from 1901. It was made the church of the new Lady Bay parish in 1950.

In Sons and Lovers, D. H. Lawrence describes a visit to a house on Holme Road.

Lady Bay has a large number of urban foxes.

Bus services
Nottingham City Transport
 11: Nottingham → Railway Station → Meadows → Trent Bridge → Lady Bay

 11C: Nottingham → Railway Station → Meadows → Trent Bridge → Lady Bay → Water Sports Centre

CT4N (Previously Nottingham Community Transport)
 Shopper 22: Gamston → West Bridgford → Ruddington → Clifton → Silverdale → Lady Bay

 Shopper 23: Gamston → Lady Bay → Silverdale → Clifton → Ruddington → West Bridgford

See also
 Lady Bay (disambiguation)

References

External links
 The Lady Bay community web site
 All Hallows Church web site
 Friends of the Hook web site

West Bridgford